Luciano Zerbini (born 16 February 1960) is an Italian retired Olympic discus thrower and shot putter.

Biography
Born in Lazise, Verona, Zebrini represented Italy at two Summer Olympics, starting in 1984 in Los Angeles, California. There he ended up in 7th place in the Men's Discus Throw competition. Zebrini then competed for Italy at the 1992 Summer Olympics. 1993 doping case.

Personal bests
Shot Put — 20.54 (1992)
Discus Throw — 64.26 (1993)

See also
Italian all-time lists - Shot put
Italian all-time lists - Discus throw

References

External links
 
 
 

1960 births
Living people
Italian male shot putters
Italian male discus throwers
Olympic athletes of Italy
Athletes (track and field) at the 1984 Summer Olympics
Athletes (track and field) at the 1992 Summer Olympics
Athletics competitors of Fiamme Oro
Mediterranean Games gold medalists for Italy
Athletes (track and field) at the 1991 Mediterranean Games
Athletes (track and field) at the 1993 Mediterranean Games
World Athletics Championships athletes for Italy
Mediterranean Games medalists in athletics
20th-century Italian people